= Pam S. Taylor-Horton =

Wyoming politician

Member of the Wyoming House of Representatives from the Laramie/H11 district
- In office 1995–1996

Pam S. Taylor-Horton is an American Democratic politician from Cheyenne, Wyoming. She represented the Laramie/H11 district in the Wyoming House of Representatives from 1995 to 1996.
